Pseudopanolis is a genus of moths of the family Noctuidae.

Species
Pseudopanolis azusa Sugi, 1970
Pseudopanolis flavimacula (Wileman, 1912)
Pseudopanolis heterogyna (Bang-Haas, 1927)
Pseudopanolis lala Owada, 1994 
Pseudopanolis puengeleri (Standfuss, 1912)
Pseudopanolis takao Inaba, 1927

References
Natural History Museum Lepidoptera genus database

Hadeninae